Verle Wright Jr. (January 19, 1928 – November 4, 2012) was an American sports shooter. He competed in the 50 metre rifle, three positions and the 50 metre rifle, prone events at the 1956 Summer Olympics.

References

1928 births
2012 deaths
American male sport shooters
Olympic shooters of the United States
Shooters at the 1956 Summer Olympics
People from Muncie, Indiana
Sportspeople from Indiana
Pan American Games medalists in shooting
Pan American Games gold medalists for the United States
Pan American Games silver medalists for the United States
Pan American Games bronze medalists for the United States
Shooters at the 1959 Pan American Games
Shooters at the 1963 Pan American Games
20th-century American people
21st-century American people